Cnemaspis perhentianensis is a species of gecko endemic to Perhentian Besar in Malaysia.

References

Cnemaspis
Reptiles described in 2008